Cladonia sulphurina is a species of cup lichen belonging to the family Cladoniaceae.

As of July 2021, its conservation status has not been estimated by the IUCN. In Iceland, it is classified as an endangered species (EN).

See also
List of Cladonia species

References

Lichens described in 1831
sulphurina
Lichen species
Taxa named by André Michaux